2019 Liga Futebol Amadora Terceira Divisão (often referred to as the LFA Terceira Divisão) is Third-highest division of the Liga Futebol Amadora and third-highest overall in the Timorense football league system.

Clubs that participated in the 2019 season

The following 11 clubs competed in the 2019 Liga Futebol Amadora Terceira Divisão, as Emmanuel FC and AS Marca were finally promoted to Liga Futebol Amadora Segunda Divisão.

Emmanuel FC (Díli), AC Mamura (Díli), AS Inur Transforma (Díli), Karau Fuik FC  (Viqueque), AD Maubisse (Maubisse), Laleia United FC (Manatuto), AS Marca FC (Díli), YMCA FC (Díli), AS Lero (Lautém), Kuda Ulun FC (Maliana) and ADR União (Díli).

Group stage

Final Tables

Grupo A
 1.Emmanuel FC                              5   5  0  0  15- 6  15       Promoted

 2.AC Mamura                                5   4  0  1  12- 5  12
 3.AS Inur Transforma                       5   3  0  2   9- 6   9
 4.Karau Fuik FC (Viqueque)                 5   2  0  3  11- 9   6
 5.AD Maubisse                              5   1  0  4   4-12   3
 6.Laleia United FC                         5   0  0  5   2-15   0

Grupo B
 1.AS Marca FC                              4   3  1  0  14- 3  10       Promoted

 2.YMCA Comoro FC                           3   2  1  0   6- 1   7
 3.AS Lero (Lautem)                         3   2  0  1   5- 4   6
 4.Kuda Ulun FC                             4   0  1  3   4- 8   1
 5.Asociação Desportiva e Recreativa União  4   0  1  3   2-15   1
NB: remaining match apparently declared void

Round 1
[Nov 5]
Laleia United       0-3 Inur Transforma    
[Nov 6]
ADR União           1-1 Kuda Ulun            
[Nov 7]
Maubisse            0-4 Karau Fuik           
[Nov 8]
YMCA                1-1 Marca                
[Nov 11]
Mamura              0-1 Emmanuel             
AS Lero             bye

Round 2
[Nov 12]
AS Lero             2-0 ADR União            
[Nov 13]
Inur Transforma     2-0 Karau Fuik           
[Nov 14]
Marca               2-1 Kuda Ulun            
[Nov 15]
Maubisse            1-5 Emmanuel             
[Nov 19]
Laleia United       0-4 Mamura               
YMCA                bye

Round 3
[Nov 18]
YMCA                3-0 ADR União            
[Nov 20]
Kuda Ulun           2-3 AS Lero              
[Nov 21]
Emmanuel            2-0 Inur Transforma      
[Nov 22]
Mamura              1-0 Maubisse             
[Nov 25]
Karau Fuik          2-0 Laleia United        
Marca               bye

Round 4
[Nov 26]
Marca               2-0 AS Lero              
[Nov 27]
Maubisse            0-2 Inur Transforma      
[Nov 28]
Kuda Ulun           0-2 YMCA                 
[Dec 3]
Emmanuel            3-2 Laleia United        
[Dec 5]
Karau Fuik          2-3 Mamura               
ADR União           bye

Round 5
[Dec 4]
ADR União           1-9 Marca                
[Dec 7]
Laleia United       0-3 Maubisse             
[Dec 8]
Inur Transforma     2-4 Mamura               
[Dec 9]
Karau Fuik          3-4 Emmanuel             
AS Lero             n/p YMCA                 
Kuda Ulun           bye

NB: AS Lero and YMCA protested against the result of the match on Dec 4 between
    União and Marca and apparently refused to play their own match; the protest
    was rejected and their last match apparently declared void.

Final Tables

Grupo A
 1.Emmanuel FC                              5   5  0  0  15- 6  15       Promoted

 2.AC Mamura                                5   4  0  1  12- 5  12
 3.AS Inur Transforma                       5   3  0  2   9- 6   9
 4.Karau Fuik FC (Viqueque)                 5   2  0  3  11- 9   6
 5.AD Maubisse                              5   1  0  4   4-12   3
 6.Laleia United FC                         5   0  0  5   2-15   0

Grupo B
 1.AS Marca FC                              4   3  1  0  14- 3  10       Promoted

 2.YMCA Comoro FC                           3   2  1  0   6- 1   7
 3.AS Lero (Lautem)                         3   2  0  1   5- 4   6
 4.Kuda Ulun FC                             4   0  1  3   4- 8   1
 5.Asociação Desportiva e Recreativa União  4   0  1  3   2-15   1
NB: remaining match apparently declared void

References

External links
Official website

2019 in Asian association football leagues
2019 in East Timorese sport